The Judeo-Alsatian Museum is a museum in Bouxwiller in the Bas-Rhin department of France. Housed in a former synagogue, the museum describes the Jewish culture and history of the Jews of Alsace.

See also 
 History of the Jews in Alsace
 List of museums in France

External links
 le Musée Judéo-Alsacien de Bouxwiller - in French

Alsatian Jews
Jewish museums in France
Museums in Bas-Rhin